Servitto is a surname. Notable people with the surname include: 

Deborah Servitto (born 1956), American judge
Matt Servitto (born 1965), American actor